Daniel William Christman  (born May 5, 1943) is a retired United States Army lieutenant general, former Superintendent of the United States Military Academy (1996–2001), and the current Senior Vice President for International Affairs, U.S. Chamber of Commerce. A 1965 graduate of West Point, he went on to earn multiple post-graduate degrees and hold numerous commands during his army career. Christman served in highly visible and strategically important positions and four times was awarded the Defense Distinguished Service Medal, the nation's highest peacetime service award.

Early life and education
Born in Youngstown, Ohio and raised in Hudson, Ohio, Christman attended Western Reserve Academy for high school and graduated first in his class from West Point in 1965. He holds master's degrees in civil engineering and public affairs from Princeton University (June 1969) and graduated with honors from George Washington University law school in 1986. He is also a graduate of the Army Command and General Staff College in June 1974 and the National War College in June 1983. He is a member of the Pennsylvania and Washington, D.C., bar associations and is also a member of the Council on Foreign Relations. He is a graduate of the army Ranger School in November 1965 and the Airborne School.

Military command positions
Christman's military career included company commands with the 2nd Engineer Battalion, Changpo-Ri, Korea (1966), and the 326th Engineer Battalion, Hue, Vietnam (1969–1970). His battalion command was with the 54th Engineer Battalion in Wildflecken, Germany (1980–1982). He commanded the Savannah District, U.S. Army Corps of Engineers in Savannah, Georgia, (1984–1986). He then was the Commanding General, U.S. Army Engineer Center and Fort Leonard Wood and Commandant, U.S. Army Engineer School, Fort Leonard Wood, Mo., (1991–1993). Christman served as the 19th U.S. Representative to the NATO Military Committee, Brussels, Belgium (1993–1994) before taking command at the United States Military Academy as the 55th Superintendent (1996–2001).

Major military staff positions
Christman's major staff assignments involved service as Staff Assistant with National Security Council, the White House (1975–1976). He was a Staff Officer in the Office of the Deputy Chief of Staff for Operations, Department of the Army, Washington, D.C., (1976–1978). In both of these assignments, Christman was responsible for advising the Army Chief of Staff and senior staff on the Strategic Arms Limitation Talks (SALT). He was also called upon to testify before the House Select Committee on intelligence regarding Soviet compliance with earlier arms control agreements. Christman also served for 21 months as Assistant to the Chairman of the Joint Chiefs of Staff General John M. Shalikashvili. In this capacity, he supported Secretary of State Warren Christopher as a member of the Middle East Peace Negotiating Team and in arms control negotiations with the Russian Federation. Additionally, Christman served for a year and a half as Army adviser to the Chairman of the Joint Chiefs of Staff, Admiral William J. Crowe, and then as Assistant to the Attorney General of the United States for National Security Affairs. Christman also served as Director of Strategy, Plans and Policy in Department of Army Headquarters, Washington, D.C. His duties in this assignment focused on negotiations relating to the Conventional Forces in Europe (CFE) arms control talks between NATO and the Warsaw Pact. In the course of supporting these negotiations on behalf of the Chief of Staff of the Army and the Chairman, JCS, Christman briefed former President Bush and traveled to Europe to brief allied heads of state and the NATO Secretary General.

Decorations
  Defense Distinguished Service Medal with three oak leaf clusters
  Army Distinguished Service Medal with oak leaf cluster
  Defense Superior Service Medal
  Legion of Merit with oak leaf cluster
  Bronze Star with oak leaf cluster
  Air Medal with two oak leaf clusters

Post military
Christman has appeared as a military analyst for CNN International during Operation Iraqi Freedom. He is a frequent contributor to CNN, and has also appeared on ABC, Fox, MSNBC, CNBC, and C-SPAN to discuss defense and national security issues. Christman has written and lectured extensively on leadership and national defense, including the ongoing war against international terrorism. Christman was appointed to the board of directors of the Ultralife Corporation of Newark, New York, in August 2001. He is currently Senior Vice President International Affairs for the U.S. Chamber of Commerce, a position he has held since June 2003, and was previously the Executive Director of the Kimsey Foundation in Washington, D.C. He also currently serves as a director of United Services Automobile Association, an insurance mutual corporation and Entegris], Inc.]], a semi-conductor equipment manufacturer.

References

External links
 Portrait of General Christman by Margaret Holland Sargent
 

1943 births
Living people
People from Youngstown, Ohio
People from Hudson, Ohio
Western Reserve Academy alumni
United States Military Academy alumni
United States Army Rangers
Princeton University School of Engineering and Applied Science alumni
Princeton School of Public and International Affairs alumni
United States Army personnel of the Vietnam War
Recipients of the Air Medal
United States Army Command and General Staff College alumni
George Washington University Law School alumni
National War College alumni
Recipients of the Legion of Merit
United States Army generals
Recipients of the Defense Superior Service Medal
Superintendents of the United States Military Academy
Recipients of the Distinguished Service Medal (US Army)
Recipients of the Defense Distinguished Service Medal
United States Chamber of Commerce people